Guignardia fulvida is a fungus that is a plant pathogen in the family Botryosphaeriaceae.

References

External links

Fungal plant pathogens and diseases
Botryosphaeriaceae
Fungi described in 1948